Parliamentary elections were held in Bulgaria on 27 May 1884. The result was a victory for the Liberal Party, which won 100 of the 171 seats. Voter turnout was 28.9%. Further members were elected from Eastern Rumelia between 11 and 18 May 1886, after it became part of Bulgaria in 1885.

Results

References

Bulgaria
1884 in Bulgaria
Parliamentary elections in Bulgaria